Montaignac-Saint-Hippolyte is a railway station in Montaignac-Saint-Hippolyte, Nouvelle-Aquitaine, France. The station is located on the Tulle - Meymac railway line. The station is served by TER (local) services operated by the SNCF.

Train services

The station is served by regional trains towards Bordeaux, Brive-la-Gaillarde and Ussel.

References

Railway stations in Corrèze